In linear algebra, the Dieudonné determinant is a generalization of the determinant of a matrix to matrices over division rings and local rings.

If K is a division ring, then the Dieudonné determinant is a homomorphism of groups from the group GLn(K) of invertible n by n matrices over K  onto the abelianization K×/[K×, K×] of the multiplicative group K× of K.

For example, the Dieudonné determinant for a 2-by-2 matrix is the residue class, in K×/[K×, K×], of

Properties
Let R be a local ring.  There is a determinant map from the matrix ring GL(R) to the abelianised unit group R×ab with the following properties:
 The determinant is invariant under elementary row operations
 The determinant of the identity is 1
 If a row is left multiplied by a in R× then the determinant is left multiplied by a
 The determinant is multiplicative: det(AB) = det(A)det(B)
 If two rows are exchanged, the determinant is multiplied by −1
 If R is commutative, then the determinant is invariant under transposition

Tannaka–Artin problem
Assume that K is finite over its centre F.  The reduced norm gives a homomorphism Nn from GLn(K) to F×.  We also have a homomorphism from GLn(K) to F× obtained by composing the Dieudonné determinant from GLn(K) to K×/[K×, K×] with the reduced norm N1 from GL1(K) = K× to F× via the abelianization.

The Tannaka–Artin problem is whether these two maps have the same kernel SLn(K).  This is true when F is locally compact but false in general.

See also
Moore determinant over a division algebra

References

.  Errata

Linear algebra
Determinants